McKinnis Peak is a peak,  high,  southeast of the Holladay Nunataks in the Wilson Hills of Antarctica. It surmounts the peninsula that is bounded by Tomilin Glacier and Noll Glacier on the west and the Gillett Ice Shelf on the east. The peak was mapped by the United States Geological Survey from surveys and U.S. Navy air photos, 1960–63, and was named by the Advisory Committee on Antarctic Names for Joe D. McKinnis of U.S. Navy Squadron VX-6, an Aviation Electronics Technician and air crewman on LC-130F aircraft in five Operation Deep Freeze deployments through 1969.

References

Mountains of Oates Land